The Rudolf Virchow lecture was an annual public lecture delivered by an eminent researcher in the field of Palaeolithic archaeology in Neuwied (Germany). The lecture was held in honour of the German physician, archaeologist and politician Rudolf Virchow and his contributions to German archaeology, whilst at the same time also honouring the outstanding accomplishments of the invited speaker.
The lecture series was discontinued after 2016, when a new price, THE HUMAN ROOTS AWARD was established to recognise significant achievements that have had an outstanding impact or great influence in understanding the archaeology of human behavioural evolution.

Background
Laureates were chosen based on their contributions to the field of Palaeolithic archaeology and nomination and presentation of the price were carried out by Römisch-Germanisches Zentralmuseum Mainz, which had particularly close ties with Virchow. For many years Virchow was member of the board of directors of the museum and campaigned for its independence.

It was also Virchow, who was largely responsible for the establishment of an interdisciplinary, scientific archaeology. Through his efforts, disciplines such as anthropology, zoology, botany, geology, and chemistry were established as accepted means of inquiry within archaeology. At the same time, the liberal politician also campaigned for social equality and against anti-Semitism.

The Rudolf-Virchow lecture was held at the Schlosstheater Neuwied. To make the lecture accessible to a broad spectrum of the public the lecture is held in German. It was one of the most long-standing archaeological public lecture series with focus on Palaeolithic archaeology in Germany.

List of Rudolf Virchow lectures

References

External links
 Official website of Römisch-Germanisches Zentralmuseum Mainz (in English)
 Rudolf-Virchow lecture (in German)

Virchow, Rudolf
Rudolf Virchow